This is a list of schools in the Wide Bay–Burnett region of Queensland, Australia, centred on the cities of Hervey Bay, Maryborough and Bundaberg. It includes the local government areas of:

 Bundaberg Region
 Cherbourg Aboriginal Shire
 Fraser Coast Region
 Gympie Region
 North Burnett Region
 South Burnett Region

Prior to 2015, the Queensland education system consisted of primary schools, which accommodated students from kindergarten to Year 7 (ages 5–13), and high schools, which accommodated students from Years 8 to 12 (ages 12–18). However, from 2015, Year 6  became the final year of primary school and Year 7 became the first year of high school.

State schools

State primary schools

State high schools and colleges

Other state schools

This includes special schools (schools for disabled children) and schools for specific purposes.

Defunct state schools

Private schools

Catholic schools
In Queensland, Catholic primary schools are usually (but not always) linked to a parish. Prior to the 1970s, most schools were founded by religious institutes, but with the decrease in membership of these institutes, together with major reforms inside the church, lay teachers and administrators began to take over the schools, a process which completed by approximately 1990.

Within the region, most schools are administered by the Catholic Education Office, Archdiocese of Brisbane, but those in Bundaberg and Monto are administered by the CEO, Diocese of Rockhampton. Both are supported by the Queensland Catholic Education Commission, which is responsible for coordinating administration, curriculum and policy across the Catholic school system. Preference for enrolment is given to Catholic students from the parish or local area, although non-Catholic students are admitted if room is available.

Independent schools

Most independent schools cater for students from preparatory to year 12.

Defunct private schools

See also
List of schools in Queensland

References

External links
, a directory of Government schools in Queensland. (Department of Education and Training – Queensland Government)
CEO Brisbane
CEO Rockhampton
About Independent schools at Independent Schools Queensland.

Wide Bay